Charles Grey Grey, or C G as he was known (13 November 1875 – 9 December 1953), was the founding editor of the British weekly The Aeroplane and the second editor of Jane's All the World's Aircraft. Among many honors, he became an honorary Companion of the Royal Aeronautical Society.

Grey was born on 13 November 1875 and educated at the Erasmus Smith School in Dublin and as an engineer at the Crystal Palace School of Engineering. Grey's first job was as a staff writer for The Autocar. His secondary role as the magazine's aviation specialist resulted in a commission from Iliffe and Sons, Ltd. to edit a penny weekly aviation paper called The Aero. In 1911, in partnership with Mr E V (Later Sir Victor) Sassoon, Grey founded The Aeroplane, remaining as editor of the influential weekly until November 1939. He was a man of decided opinions as evidenced in his editorials for the magazine over three decades. Unfortunately for him these included strong support for the fascist dictators of Italy and Germany, which played no small part in his leaving the magazine.

Grey took over as editor of the annual issues of Jane's All the World's Aircraft from 1916 to 1940. After leaving The Aeroplane, Grey served from 1939 as air correspondent of The Yorkshire Evening Post and the  Edinburgh Evening News as well as various overseas journals. Grey also wrote a number of aviation books including  A History of the Air Ministry (1940), The Luftwaffe (1944) and The Civil Air War (1945), the latter an opinionated review of likely post-war airline development and Britain's role in that process.

"Anyone who read C G in the 'twenties and 'thirties without having met him might have supposed his critical references, and sometimes perverse and acid comments, reflected his nature and personality. Nothing could have been further from the truth. As long as we knew him he was a gentle and kindly man, always charming and generous to his friends, among whom he numbered rivals. Today there are men on Flight's staff who recall a kind word of encouragement here or a spot of advice there from the one-and-only C G, particularly when they were taking their first tentative steps in the hard and competitive world of journalism. His goodwill continued to be reflected in frequent correspondence. From the first to the last occasion upon which we talked to him, he never once failed to express either an original thought or to reveal an unexpected viewpoint on some current topic. Neither his writing nor his conversation was ever lacking in humour and regardless of one's age."

- Flight Magazine, 18 December 1953, published after Grey's death on 9 December 1953.

References

Further reading

 National Archives of Australia: The Rt Hon Richard Gardiner CASEY Baron of Berwick, Victoria, KG, GCMG, PC, CH, DSO, MC; M1129, Correspondence files, alphabetical series; GREY/C G, GREY, Charles Grey [aeronautical journalist, Editor of Jane's All the World's Aircraft and The Aeroplane; includes correspondence on Houdini and his Australian flight, fascism etc.], 1948-1954 (Item barcode: 31647177)

Aviation writers
People educated at The High School, Dublin
1875 births
1953 deaths